Sphodanam is a 1981 Indian Malayalam-language film directed by P. G. Viswambharan, starring Sukumaran, M. G. Soman,  Mammootty, Ravikumar and Seema. The role of Sukumaran was initially intended for Jayan. However, he died before production began.

Plot 

Sphodanam is the story of two people who have to fight for justice against the landlord as they are the voice of the working class.

Cast 

Sukumaran as Gopi
M. G. Soman as Surendran
Mammootty  as Thankappan
Ravikumar as Engineer
Seema as Lalitha
Sheela  as Devaki
Balan K. Nair as Muthalali
K. P. Ummer as Police Officer
Prameela as Narayanapilla's wife
Kuthiravattam Pappu as Narayana Pilla
Sankaradi as Krishnan
 Santhakumari as Muthalali's wife
Shubha as Gouri
Mala Aravindan as Vasu Pilla
Jagathi Sreekumar as Kuttan Pilla
Kaviyoor Ponnamma as Gopi's mother
Santo Krishnan as Kunjappi
KPAC Premachandran as Sankaran
Preman

Production 
Sphodanam was one of the earliest films of actor Mammootty, before he being turned a major star. In a late interview to a film weekly, actress Sheela, who played the lead lady in Sphodanam and was also the producer of the film, recalled the events during the shoot. A scene wherein actors Sukumaran, and Mammootty jumping across a prison wall was shot with a foam bed lying upon the ground on which the actors would fall. Mammootty, who was just a newbie actor at the time, was refused to have the privilege of a bed as a protection by the director P. G. Vishwambharan. Vishwambharan said a new face like Mammootty doesn't deserve such privileges, though Sheela argued with him against such a discrimination. Mammootty, however, jumped from the wall without the safety bed and suffered an injury to his leg. The actor completed his remaining parts and many other films with the fractured leg.

Soundtrack 
The music was composed by Shankar–Ganesh and the lyrics were written by O. N. V. Kurup.

References

External links 
 

1980s Malayalam-language films
1981 action films
1981 films
Films directed by P. G. Viswambharan
Films scored by Shankar–Ganesh
Indian action films